The 2013 World Judo Championships were held at the Ginásio do Maracanãzinho in Rio de Janeiro, Brazil from 26 August to 1 September.

Schedule
All times are local (UTC−3).

Medal summary

Medal table

Men's events

Women's events

References

Notes:

External links
Official website
Results
Video Footage World Championship 2013 in Rio de Janeiro

 
World Judo Championships
World Championships
World Championships
Judo World Championships
Judo World Championships
Judo World Championships
World Judo Championships
World Judo Championships
World Championships